This page covers the seasons from 1980–81 to 1989–90 which saw the club win the League and the League Cup, reach three Scottish Cup finals, and the European Cup semi-finals and UEFA Cup Final.

1980–81

The club finished the season in fifth place, missing out on European qualification through their league finish but clinching a UEFA Cup place after winning the League Cup. United also reached the final of the Scottish Cup but were beaten by Rangers after a replay. The club were knocked out of the UEFA Cup in the second round by Belgian side Lokeren.

1981–82

The club finished fourth this season, reaching a third successive League Cup Final, only to be beaten at Hampden by Rangers for the second successive season. In the Scottish Cup, United were beaten in the quarter-finals by St Mirren. The club reached the UEFA Cup quarter-finals but were beaten by Yugoslavian side Radnički Niš.

Paul Sturrock was named Scottish Footballer of the Year for his performances during the season.

1982–83

The club won the Premier Division this season, clinching the title on the final day by winning at Dens Park, home of rivals Dundee, and qualifying for the European Cup for the first time. In cup matters, United were beaten in the League Cup semi-finals by Celtic, and for the second season running, St Mirren knocked United out of the Socttish Cup, this time in the third round. Once again, the club reached the UEFA Cup quarter-finals, being beaten this time by Czechoslovakian side Bohemians ČKD Praha.

1983–84

The club finished the league season in third, qualifying for the UEFA Cup. United were beaten by Aberdeen after a replay in the quarter-finals, while eventual winners Rangers knocked the club out of the League Cup in the semi-finals. In the club's inaugural European Cup campaign, United reached the semi-finals, being beaten – somewhat controversially – by Roma.

1984–85

Once again, United finished fourth, with the top four finishing in the same positions as the previous season. In the domestic cups, the club reached both finals only to be beaten by both halves of the Old Firm; in the Scottish Cup Final, Celtic triumphed 2–1 while Rangers won the League Cup 1–0. In the UEFA Cup third round, United were narrowly eliminated 5–4 on aggregate by Manchester United.

1985–86

United finished the season in third place just three points behind champions Celtic. In the domestic cups, the club reached the semi-finals of both the Scottish Cup and League Cup. In the UEFA Cup, United suffered another narrow third round exit, being beaten this time by Swiss side Neuchâtel Xamax}.

1986–87

United finished the season in third place, nine points behind champions Rangers. The club reached the semi-finals of the League Cup, being beaten by Rangers. At the end of the season, the club played two finals in four days: the Scottish Cup Final and UEFA Cup Final. Losing the first leg of the UEFA Final in Gothenburg, United then lost the Scottish Cup in extra-time against St Mirren and could only draw at home to IFK Gothenburg four days later. The conduct of United's fans earned them the inaugural FIFA Fair Play Award.

1987–88

United finished the season in fifth place, some 25 points behind champions Celtic. The club reached the quarter-finals of the League Cup, being beaten by rivals Dundee, while a second successive Scottish Cup Final appearance also resulted in a second successive defeat, this time to Celtic, where two late Frank McAvennie goals won the Cup. In the UEFA Cup, United were eliminated by TJ Vítkovice in the second round.

1988–89

United finished the season in fourth place, twelve points behind champions Rangers. The club reached the semi-finals of the League Cup, being beaten by Aberdeen, who went on to reach the final, while United were beaten in the Scottish Cup quarter-finals by eventual finalists Rangers, albeit after a replay. In the Cup Winners' Cup, United were eliminated by Dinamo Bucharest in the second round.

1989–90

United finished the season in fourth place, sixteen points behind champions Rangers. The club were knocked out the League Cup by Hamilton Academical in the third round, while Aberdeen – who went on to win the Cup – eliminated United in the Scottish Cup semi-finals In the UEFA Cup, United were eliminated by Royal Antwerp in the second round.

References

Dundee United F.C.